Commandant Ducuing (F795) is a  in the French Navy. The vessel is home ported at Toulon.

Design 

Crewed by 90 sailors, these vessels have the reputation of being among the most difficult in bad weather. Their high windage makes them particularly sensitive to pitch and roll as soon as the sea is formed.

Their armament, consequent for a vessel of this tonnage, allows them to manage a large spectrum of missions. During the Cold War, they were primarily used to patrol the continental shelf of the Atlantic Ocean in search of Soviet Navy submarines. Due to the poor performance of the hull sonar, as soon as an echo appeared, the reinforcement of an anti-submarine warfare frigate was necessary to chase it using its towed variable depth sonar.

Their role as patrollers now consists mainly of patrol and assistance missions, as well as participation in UN missions (blockades, flag checks) or similar marine policing tasks (fight against drugs, extraction of nationals, fisheries control, etc.). Their anti-ship missiles have been landed, but they carry several machine guns and machine guns, more suited to their new missions.

The vessel's construction cost was estimated at 270,000,000 French francs.

Construction and career 
Commandant Ducuing was laid down on 1 October 1980 at Arsenal de Lorient, Lorient. Launched on 26 September 1981 and commissioned on 17 March 1983.

She took part in Opération Artimon in 1990. In April 2009 the aviso took part in Operation Tanit, an operation to free a French yacht that was hijacked by Somali pirates. The aviso, sailing from Jeddah, Saudi Arabia, made a stopover on 8 and 9 June 2010 at the Iraqi port of Umm Qasr, which was a first for a French ship for 32 years.

In June 2015, the ship was responsible for monitoring bluefin tuna fishing off Malta.

In 2022, it was indicated that the ship would be equipped with the SMDM (navy mini-drone system) to enhance her surveillance capabilities. In 2022–23, the ship deployed to the Gulf of Guinea for two months to assist local navies in countering, principally Chinese, illegal overfishing.

She is scheduled to be withdrawn from service in 2025 and be replaced by one of a new class of ocean-going Patrol Vessels (the Patrouilleurs Océanique).

Citations 

Ships built in Lorient
1981 ships
D'Estienne d'Orves-class avisos